Jean-Michel Raimond (born  in Orléans) is a French physicist working in the field of quantum mechanics.

Biography 
Raimond enrolled at the École normale supérieure (rue d'Ulm) (ENS) in 1975. After graduating with a DEA  in atomic and molecular physics, his first research work was in superradiance and Rydberg atoms.

He became Research Associate and Research Fellow at the Centre national de la recherche scientifique (CNRS), working under Serge Haroche towards his 1984 thesis  ("Radiative properties of Rydberg atoms in a resonant cavity").

Since 1988, he has taught at the Université Pierre-et-Marie-Curie.

From 1994 to 1999, he was a junior member of the Institut universitaire de France.

From 2001 to 2011, he was a senior member and held the chair of quantum optics.

From 2004 to 2009, he was head of the Department of Physics at the École normale supérieure (rue d'Ulm).

He became interested in Rydberg atoms, because their relatively large size and sensitivity to microwave radiation makes them particularly suited to studies of matter/energy interaction. He demonstrated that these atoms, coupled to superconducting cavities containing some photons, are ideal systems for testing the laws of quantum decoherence and for demonstrating the possibility of constructing the components of quantum logic, with promising results for their use in informatics.

His most recent work, quoted in the 2012 Nobel Prize-winning work, allows photons to be counted in the cavity without their being destroyed, thus directly demonstrating the quantum measurement problem. This ideal measure also helps combat quantum decoherence with a quantum feedback scheme which keeps the number of photons in the cavity constant.

Raimond is the son of Michel Raimond, late professor of French literature at the Sorbonne.

Awards
 Prix Fernand Holweck by the Académie des sciences (1985)
 Grand prix Ampère de l'Électricité de France, given by the Académie des sciences, with M. Brune (1998)
 Grand Prix Jean-Ricard by the Société française de physique (2007)
 Gay-Lussac-Humboldt research award by the Fondation Alexander von Humboldt (2012)
 European Physical Society Edison-Volta prize (2014)
 Chevalier de la Légion d'honneur
 Officer of the Ordre des Palmes Académiques

Principal publications
 In this experiment, for the first time, wave function collapse was observed using quantum mechanical methods.
). Peer reviewed article describing in particular quantum logical operations.
 
  First ideal measurement (i.e. without quantum demolition) of the number of photons in a cavity.
 
  First demonstration of a quantum retroaction schema in a quantum continuum.

References

External links
  Cavity Quantum Electro Dynamics
  Conférence Ernest - Promenade dans le monde quantique

1955 births
Living people
École Normale Supérieure alumni
Academic staff of the École Normale Supérieure
French physicists
Scientists from Orléans
Quantum physicists
Fellows of the American Physical Society